The 2012 Good Sam Roadside Assistance 500 was a NASCAR Sprint Cup Series stock car race held on October 7, 2012 at Talladega Superspeedway in Talladega, Alabama, United States. Contested over 188 laps on the 2.66-mile (4.3 km) asphalt tri-oval, it was the thirtieth race of the 2012 Sprint Cup Series season, as well as the fourth race in the ten-race Chase for the Sprint Cup, which ends the season.

Matt Kenseth of Roush Fenway Racing won the race, his second of the season, and snapped a twenty-nine race winless streak extending back to the Daytona 500; while Jeff Gordon finished second and Kyle Busch finished third. The Big One hit the field on the final lap, collecting 25 cars in turn four, with Tony Stewart flying in the air after being accidentally tagged by Michael Waltrip, who in turn was being pushed by Casey Mears.

Report

Background

Talladega Superspeedway is one of six superspeedways to hold NASCAR races; the others are Daytona International Speedway, Auto Club Speedway, Indianapolis Motor Speedway, Pocono Raceway and Michigan International Speedway. The track's turns are banked at thirty-three degrees, while the front stretch, the location of the finish line, is banked at 16.5 degrees. The back stretch has a two-degree banking. Talladega Superspeedway can seat up to 143,231 people.

Before the race, Brad Keselowski led the Drivers' Championship with 2,142 points, and Jimmie Johnson stood in second with 2,137 points. Denny Hamlin followed in third with 2,126 points, nine points ahead of Clint Bowyer and sixteen ahead of Tony Stewart in fourth and fifth. Kasey Kahne with 2,110 was seven points ahead of Dale Earnhardt Jr., as Martin Truex Jr. with 2,100 points, was four points ahead of Kevin Harvick, and six in front of Jeff Gordon. Greg Biffle and Matt Kenseth was eleventh and twelfth with 2,091 and 2,070 points, respectively.

In the Manufacturers' Championship, Chevrolet was leading with 197 points, twenty-five points ahead of Toyota. Ford, with 138 points, was seven points ahead of Dodge in the battle for third. Clint Bowyer is the race's defending champion after winning the event in 2011.

Qualifying results

Race

To begin pre-race ceremonies, Billy Irvin, a volunteer with Alabama Raceway Ministries and director of ministry relations with FAITH Radio in Montgomery, Alabama, delivered the invocation. Then, singer Raelynn performed the National anthem. At 2:11 PM, actor Kevin James gave the command to start engines.

At the drop of the green flag, Kasey Kahne led, and continued to lead for the first ten laps. On lap 11, Trevor Bayne took the lead with drafting help from Clint Bowyer. Three laps later, Dale Earnhardt Jr. claimed the lead. Earnhardt Jr. led for two laps before being passed by Kyle Busch.

On lap 17, the first caution came out for a three car crash in turn 4 that eliminated Carl Edwards and Cole Whitt from contention, and also gave some heavy damage to Joey Logano. Kyle Busch continued to lead the field when the green flag waved on lap 22. Two laps later, Matt Kenseth passed Busch to lead. Kenseth led for ten laps, before Earnhardt Jr. passed him. On lap 35, Denny Hamlin reported a loose rearview mirror in his car. Earnhardt Jr. led for seven laps before being repassed by Kenseth on lap 41. One lap later, Kenseth got loose off of Greg Biffle's bumper, and he went from 1st to 31st place in a matter of seconds, while Earnhardt Jr. received the lead. On lap 50, Casey Mears received the lead. A lap later, Mears was passed by Jeff Burton, who led for two laps before Bayne received the lead.

By lap 58, Mears had re-received the lead. From lap 60 to lap 62, the field was cycled through green-flag pit stops. Earnhardt, Jr, Bayne, Kyle Busch, and others received speeding penalties. These penalties ultimately resulted in Earnhardt Jr. and Busch being trapped a lap down for a significant chunk of the mid-portion of the race. On lap 64, Jimmie Johnson took the lead. On lap 73, Jeff Gordon passed Johnson with drafting help from Kenseth. By lap 83, Jamie McMurray had taken the lead.

On lap 90, Kurt Busch, in his last start for Phoenix Racing, received the lead. Five laps later, Kenseth took the lead. He led for two laps before Busch repassed him. Two laps after that, the second caution of the race waved when Kasey Kahne ran out of fuel, and simultaneously, Busch was spun out on the back straightaway by Jamie McMurray. Although the car took damage from hitting the inside wall, Busch was able to refire the engine, after the emergency crews had already reached him. A medical bag that was sitting on top of the car was subsequently thrown from the back decklid. NASCAR parked Busch for pulling away and trying to drive back to the garage despite the fact that his car was shedding debris.

On the restart at lap 104, Marcos Ambrose was the leader, but was passed during the next lap by Kenseth. On lap 121, Kyle Busch got onto the tail end of the lead lap, being pushed by Mears. On lap 127, Greg Biffle assumed the lead for one lap before being repassed by Kenseth. Four laps after that, Biffle pushed McMurray into the lead. Busch was shuffled back during this green flag run.

On lap 139, the third caution flag of the race was waved for debris. Earnhardt Jr. got back on the lead lap and Kyle Busch returned to the lead lap with a free pass. At the restart on lap 143, Casey Mears was leading again. Laps later, Biffle passed him. On lap 151, McMurray received the lead. A lap later, Biffle repassed him. On lap 155, Kevin Harvick gave McMurray a shove to reclaim the lead for two laps. On lap 168, Harvick became the leader. He led for three laps before Mears assumed the lead. On lap 173, the lead returned to McMurray. On lap 182, Kenseth claimed the lead, and the fourth caution came out as McMurray spun out in the tri-oval off of Harvick's bumper. Under the caution, 11 drivers did not pit, so Clint Bowyer led the field at the restart on lap 187.

Final lap and repercussions

During the Green-White-Checkered attempt, Ryan Newman tried to squeeze it four-wide in between Casey Mears and Jimmie Johnson in the middle of the pack in turn 2 and was able to not cause a wreck. Down the backstretch, Kenseth tried to block Clint Bowyer for the lead but Kenseth touched Bowyer in the right front forcing him below the yellow line. Coming to the white flag, Tony Stewart claimed the lead in the trioval. Before the White Flag was waived, the pack behind Stewart and Kenseth had all bunched up to four-wide going four-rows back. Kenseth attempted to make a charge on the outside down the back straightaway. Entering turn three, Kenseth was leading the high lane and much of the field was bunched up behind him and Stewart. In turn four, Casey Mears started pushing Michael Waltrip and the pair made a move on the inside of Stewart. As Stewart tried to block, he was turned sideways by Waltrip's car and spun into the pack. Waltrip just clipped Kevin Harvick's car and then hit the outside wall, collecting 25 cars in all. Stewart's car went airborne and was upside down on top of several cars, including Kasey Kahne, Clint Bowyer, and Paul Menard. Kenseth was the only one in front of the crash and he made it to the finish line to win the race followed by Jeff Gordon and Kyle Busch, who got through by going down to the apron. Greg Biffle and Ryan Newman, who were on the outside back of the four-wide pack before the crash, managed to avoid it by slowing down and weaving through out-of-control cars to finish in sixth and ninth place respectively. Only 17 of the 25 cars that were involved in the wreck were able to finish the race.

Dale Earnhardt Jr. contacted a neurosurgeon following headaches from the crash two days later, and a day later, the neurosurgeon medically disqualified Earnhardt following a concussion from being part of this crash.  The next day, Earnhardt admitted in a press conference he had been concussed in an August 29 tire test at Kansas after a tire failure at speeds exceeding 300 km/h in Turn 1, and hired Regan Smith in the #88 until he was cleared.  This eventually led to an official concussion protocol by NASCAR that would be in full effect by the 2014 season, including a new Chase format that would fit with the protocol.

Results

Race results

Note: Cars that finished the final lap, despite being involved in the crash, are scored as having completed all 189 laps.

The lead changed 54 times, the 39th time a race at Talladega had broken 40 official lead changes.

Standings after the race

Drivers' Championship standings

Manufacturers' Championship standings

Note: Only the first twelve positions are included for the driver standings.

References

NASCAR races at Talladega Superspeedway
Good Sam Roadside Assistance 500
Good Sam Roadside Assistance 500
Good Sam Roadside Assistance 500